The 1995 1. divisjon, Norway's second-tier football league, began play on 29 April 1995 and ended on 1 October 1995. The league was contested by 24 teams, divided in two groups and the winner of each group won promotion to Tippeligaen, while the runners-up played a promotion-playoff to win promotion. The bottom three teams were relegated to the 2. divisjon.

Moss and Skeid won promotion to Tippeligaen as group-winners, while Strømsgodset was promoted after beating Sogndal in the promotion play-off. Åndalsnes, Sarpsborg, Vard Haugesund, Alta, Sandefjord and Mjølner was relegated to the 2. divisjon.

League tables

Group 1

Group 2

See also
 1995 Tippeligaen
 1995 2. divisjon
 1995 3. divisjon

References

Norwegian First Division seasons
2
Norway
Norway